This is a list of streams and rivers in the U.S. state of Pennsylvania.

By drainage basin
This list is arranged by drainage basin, with respective tributaries indented under each larger stream's name.

Delaware Bay

Chesapeake Bay
Elk River (MD)
Big Elk Creek
Little Elk Creek
North East River (MD)
North East Creek
Gunpowder River

Susquehanna River

Susquehanna River
Deer Creek
Octoraro Creek
West Branch Octoraro Creek
Stewart Run
East Branch Octoraro Creek
Muddy Run
Conowingo Creek
Fishing Creek (Lancaster County)
Muddy Creek (Susquehanna River tributary)
North Branch Muddy Creek
South Branch Muddy Creek
Tucquan Creek
Otter Creek
Pequea Creek
Big Beaver Creek
Little Beaver Creek
Conestoga River
Little Conestoga Creek
Mill Creek
Lititz Run
Cocalico Creek
Hammer Creek
Middle Creek
Indian Run
Little Cocalico Creek
Muddy Creek (Conestoga River tributary)
Little Muddy Creek
Fishing Creek (York County)
Cabin Creek
Kreutz Creek
Chiques Creek (known as Chickies Creek until 2002)
Donegal Creek
Little Chiques Creek
Codorus Creek
South Branch Codorus Creek
East Branch Codorus Creek
Centerville Creek
West Branch Codorus Creek
Oil Creek
Conoy Creek
Black Gut
Conewago Creek (west) (in Adams and York counties)
Little Conewago Creek (west)
Bennett Run
Beaver Creek (York County)
Beaver Creek (Adams County)
Bermudian Creek
Mud Run
North Branch Bermudian Creek
Latimore Creek
South Branch Conewago Creek
Opossum Creek
Conewago Creek (east) (in Lebanon, Dauphin, and Lancaster counties)
Lynch Run
Brills Run
Hoffer Creek
Little Conewago Creek (east)
Fishing Creek (Newberry Township)
Swatara Creek
Iron Run
Beaver Creek
Spring Creek
Manada Creek
Bow Creek
Quittapahilla Creek
Snitz Creek
Brandywine Creek (Quittapahilla Creek tributary)
Indiantown Run
Little Swatara Creek
Elizabeth Run
Crosskill Creek
Mill Creek
Lower Little Swatara Creek
Upper Little Swatara Creek
Good Spring Creek
Yellow Breeches Creek
Stony Run
Mountain Creek
Spring Creek
Slotznick Run
Paxton Creek
Asylum Run
Black Run
Conodoguinet Creek
Hogestown Run
LeTort Spring Run
Big Spring Creek
Doubling Gap Creek
Middle Spring Creek
Muddy Run (Conodoguinet Creek tributary)
Rowe Run
Lehman Run
Trout Run (Conodoguinet Creek tributary)
Fishing Creek (east bank Susquehanna River tributary)
Fishing Creek (Perry County) (west bank Susquehanna River tributary)
Stony Creek
Rattling Run
Rausch Creek
Clark Creek
Sherman Creek
Laurel Run
Bixler's Run
Little Juniata Creek

Juniata River
Little Buffalo Creek
Buffalo Creek
Wildcat Run
Cocolamus Creek
Delaware Creek
Raccoon Creek
Doe Run
Tuscarora Creek
East Licking Creek
Dougherty Run
Narrows Branch Tuscarora Creek
Lost Creek
Jacks Creek
Kishacoquillas Creek
Tea Creek
Honey Creek
Laurel Creek
Treaster Run
Havice Creek
Little Kishacoquillas Creek
West Licking Creek
Aughwick Creek
Blacklog Creek
Shade Creek
Three Springs Creek
Little Aughwick Creek
North Branch Little Aughwick Creek
South Branch Little Aughwick Creek
Sideling Hill Creek
Wooden Bridge Creek
Roaring Run
Mill Creek
Saddler Creek
Raystown Branch Juniata River
Great Trough Creek
Little Trough Creek
Shoup Run
Yellow Creek
Brush Creek (Raystown Branch Juniata River tributary)
Shaffer Creek
Brush Creek (Shaffer Creek tributary)
Chapman Run
Clear Creek
Bloody Run
Cove Creek
Dunning Creek
Bobs Creek
Shobers Run
Buffalo Run
Milligan Run
Shawnee Branch
Standing Stone Creek
East Branch Standing Stone Creek
Laurel Run
Crooked Creek
Shaver Creek
Little Juniata River
Spruce Creek
Warriors Mark Run
Sinking Run
Bald Eagle Creek
Bells Gap Run
Frankstown Branch Juniata River
Clover Creek
Snare Run
Piney Creek
Canoe Creek
Beaverdam Branch Juniata River
Brush Run
Blair Gap Run
Sugar Run
Burgoon Run
Mill Run
Halter Creek
Powell Creek
Armstrong Creek
Hunters Run
Wiconisco Creek
Little Wiconisco Creek
Rattling Creek
Shippens Run
Bargers Run
Barger Run
Toad Hollow
Spruce Run
Mahantango Creek
Deep Creek
Snow Creek
Pine Creek
Deep Creek
Hans Yost Creek
Rausch Creek
East Branch Rausch Creek
West Branch Rausch Creek
Little Mahantango Creek
Boyers Run
Mahantango Creek
North Branch Mahantango Creek
Aline Creek
West Branch Mahantango Creek
Dobson Run
Leiningers Run
Quaker Run
Hoffer Creek
Dalmatia Creek
Independence Run
Chapman Creek
Herrold Run
Silver Creek
Fidlers Run
Mahanoy Creek
Schwaben Creek
Mouse Creek
Middle Creek
Zerbe Run
Crab Run
Little Mahanoy Creek
Rattling Run
Shenandoah Creek
Lost Creek
Kehly Run
North Mahanoy Creek
Penns Creek
Middle Creek
Susquehecka Creek
Dry Run
Kern Run
Wetzel Run
Luphers Run
Beaver Creek
Pine Creek
Elk Creek
Sinking Creek
Potter Run
Boile Run
Hallowing Run
Sealholtz Run
Rolling Green Run
Shamokin Creek
Little Shamokin Creek
Plum Creek
Lick Creek
Millers Run
Bennys Run
Trout Run
Furnace Run
Carbon Run
Coal Run
Quaker Run
Locust Creek
North Branch Shamokin Creek
West Branch Susquehanna River
Winfield Creek
Turtle Creek
Chillisquaque Creek
Beaver Run
Mud Creek (Chillisquaque Creek tributary)
West Branch Chillisquaque Creek
County Line Branch
McKee Run
Beaver Run
East Branch Chillisquaque Creek
White Hall Creek
Middle Branch Chillisquaque Creek
Buffalo Creek
Little Buffalo Creek
Spruce Run
Muddy Run
Black Run
Beaver Run
Stony Run
Rapid Run
Halfway Run
Yankee Run
North Branch Buffalo Creek
Coal Run
Panther Run
Slide Hollow
Limestone Run (Montour and Northumberland Counties, Pennsylvania)
Muddy Run
Warrior Run
White Deer Creek
Lick Run
Mile Run
Sand Spring Run
Cowbell Hollow
Tunis Run
Spring Run
Dry Run
Delaware Run
White Deer Hole Creek
Spring Creek
Beartrap Hollow
Black Run
Black Hole Creek
Turkey Run
Glade Run
Muncy Creek
Wolf Run
Oak Run
Little Muncy Creek
Cox Run
Shepman Run
Laurel Run
Broad Run
German Run
Jakes Run
Derr Run
Big Run
Beaver Run
Marsh Run
Little Indian Run
West Branch Little Muncy Creek
West Creek
Buck Run
Loyalsock Creek
Mill Creek
Wallis Run
Bear Creek
Plunketts Creek
Elk Creek
Kings Creek
Little Loyalsock Creek
Black Creek
Birch Creek
Lopez Creek
Pigeon Creek
Lycoming Creek
Pleasant Stream
Rock Run
Roaring Branch
Larrys Creek
Rauchtown Run/Antes Creek
Pine Creek
Little Pine Creek
Texas Creek
Hughes Run
Zimmerman Creek
Blockhouse Creek
Blacks Creek
Slate Run
Cedar Run
Babb Creek
Stony Fork Creek
Marsh Creek
West Branch Pine Creek
Lyman Run
Bald Eagle Creek
Fishing Creek
Beech Creek
Marsh Creek
Spring Creek
Buffalo Run
Logan Branch
Slab Cabin Run
Spring Creek
Wallace Run
Lick Run
Tangascootack Creek
North Fork Tangascootack Creek
Hyner Run
Young Womans Creek
Drury Run
Kettle Creek
Twomile Run
Middle Branch Twomile Run
Huling Branch
Hammersley Fork
Little Kettle Creek
Cross Fork
Fish Dam Run
Dennison Fork
Cooks Run
Lick Run
Sinnemahoning Creek
First Fork Sinnemahoning Creek
Bailey Run
East Fork Sinnemahoning Creek
Freeman Run
Bennett Branch
Trout Run
Medix Run
Laurel Run
Driftwood Branch
Sinnemahoning Portage Creek
West Creek
North Creek
Clear Creek
Birch Island Run
Mosquito Creek
Gifford Run
Moshannon Creek
Black Moshannon Creek
Cold Stream
Deer Creek
Trout Run
Lick Run
Flegals Run
Jerrys Run
Fork Run
Stone Run
Clearfield Creek
Little Clearfield Creek
Gazzam Run
Watts Creek
Anderson Creek
Kratzer Run
Bilger Run
Fenton Run
Hughey Run
Bear Run
Little Anderson Creek
Panther Run
Irvin Branch
Montgomery Run
Burns Run
Coupler Run
Dressler Run
Blanchard Run
Stony Run
Whitney Run
Chest Creek
Bear Run
Cush Creek
Lithia Springs Creek
Johnson Creek
Gravel Run
Packers Run
Raups Run
Kipps Run
Wilson Run
Gaskins Run
Mahoning Creek (Susquehanna River tributary)
Sechler Run
Blizzards Run
Kase Run
Mauses Creek
Indian Creek
Toby Run
Logan Run
Little Roaring Creek
Roaring Creek
South Branch Roaring Creek
Mugser Run
Lick Run
Mill Creek
Catawissa Creek
Furnace Run
Scotch Run
Fisher Run
Mine Gap Run
Beaver Run
Long Hollow
Stranger Hollow
Klingermans Run
Cranberry Run
Crooked Run
Tomhicken Creek
Raccoon Creek
Little Crooked Run
Sugarloaf Creek
Little Tomhicken Creek
Little Catawissa Creek
Stony Run
Trexler Run
Dark Run
Rattling Run
Davis Run
Messers Run
Negro Hollow
Spies Run
Cross Run
Hunkydory Creek
Corn Run
Fishing Creek
Montour Run
Hemlock Creek
Frozen Run
West Hemlock Creek
Little Fishing Creek
Spruce Run
West Branch Run
Shingle Run
Lick Run
Wolfhouse Run
Devil Hole Run
Little Brier Run
Stony Brook (Fishing Creek tributary)
Deerlick Run
Green Creek
Mud Run
Rickard Hollow
Little Green Creek
Huntington Creek
Pine Creek
Little Pine Creek
Bell Creek
Wasp Branch
Brish Run
Kingsbury Brook
Rogers Creek
Marsh Creek
Black Ash Creek
Marshall Hollow
Kitchen Creek
Maple Run
Crooked Creek
Boston Run
Maple Spring Brook
Shingle Cabin Brook
Phillips Creek
Lick Branch
Arnold Creek
Shingle Run
Laurel Run
Mitchler Run
Raven Creek
East Branch Raven Creek
Stine Hollow
West Creek
Spencer Run
York Hollow
Coles Creek
Hess Hollow
Fallow Hollow
Ashelman Run
Marsh Run
Chimneystack Run
West Branch Fishing Creek
Rough Run
Peterman Run
Elk Run
Long Run
Hog Run
Gallows Run
Bloody Run
Painter Run
Oxhorn Run
Big Run
Shingle Mill Run
Bearwallow Run
Deep Hollow
Laurel Run
Hemlock Run
Slip Run
Swanks Run
East Branch Fishing Creek
Blackberry Run
Trout Run
Lead Run
Heberly Run
Quinn Run
Shanty Run
Meeker Run
Big Run
Sullivan Branch
Pigeon Run
Hunts Run
Ore Run
Kinney Run
Tenmile Run
Briar Creek
East Branch Briar Creek
Glen Brook
Kashinka Hollow
West Branch Briar Creek
Fester Hollow
Cabin Run
Nescopeck Creek
Black Creek
Scotch Run
Falls Run
Barnes Run
Stony Creek (Black Creek tributary)
Cranberry Creek
Wolffs Run
Little Black Creek
Little Nescopeck Creek
Long Run (Nescopeck Creek tributary)
Oley Creek
Long Hollow (Oley Creek tributary)
Little Nescopeck Creek
Conety Run
Creasy Creek
Reilly Creek
Mill Creek
Salem Creek
Walker Run
Big Wapwallopen Creek
Balliet Run
Watering Run
Bow Creek
Little Wapwallopen Creek
Pond Creek
Nuangola Outlet
Rocky Run
Turtle Creek
Black Creek
Paddy Run
Shickshinny Creek
Little Shickshinny Creek
Reyburn Creek
Culver Creek
Hunlock Creek
Roaring Brook
Lewis Run
Harveys Creek
East Fork Harveys Creek
Drakes Creek
Pikes Creek
Fades Creek
Paint Spring Run
Bear Hollow Creek
Newport Creek
South Branch Newport Creek
Reservoir Creek
Middle Branch Newport Creek
Northbranch Newport Creek
Nanticoke Creek
Espy Run
Warrior Creek
Solomon Creek
Spring Run
Sugar Notch Run
Pine Creek
Toby Creek
Huntsville Creek
Browns Creek
Trout Brook
Mill Creek
Laurel Run
Deep Hollow
Gardner Creek
Lampblack Creek
Three Spring Brook
Deep Creek
Rough Hollow
Warden Creek
Abrahams Creek

Lackawanna River
Red Spring Run
Saint Johns Creek
Mill Creek
Lidy Creek
Collins Creek
Spring Brook
Covey Swamp Creek
Monument Creek
Trout Creek
Green Run
Rattlesnake Creek
Six Springs Creek
Plank Bridge Creek
Panther Creek
Painter Creek
Keyser Creek
Lindy Creek
Lucky Run
Stafford Meadow Brook
Roaring Brook
Little Roaring Brook
Rock Bottom Creek
White Oak Run
Kellum Creek
Van Brunt Creek
Langan Creek
Bear Brook
East Branch Roaring Brook
Lake Run
Emerson Run
Meadow Brook
Leggetts Creek
Leach Creek
South Branch Leach Creek
Clover Hill Creek
Summit Lake Creek
Price Creek
Pancoast Creek
Eddy Creek
Hull Creek
Wildcat Creek
West Branch Tinklepaugh Creek
Sterry Creek
Grassy Island Creek
Laurel Run
White Oak Run
Indian Cave Creek
Aylesworth Creek
Callender Gap Creek
Rush Brook
Powderly Creek
Lees Creek
Meredith Creek
Fall Brook
Racket Brook
Coal Brook
Wilson Creek
Rogers Brook
Clarks Creek
Meredith Brook
Brace Brook
East Branch Lackawanna River
West Branch Lackawanna River
Fiddle Lake Creek
Hicks Creek
Obendoffers Creek
Gardner Creek
Lewis Creek
Sutton Creek
Cider Run
Bowman Creek
Benson Hollow
Sugar Hollow Creek
Marsh Creek
Sugar Run
Roaring Run
Newton Run
South Branch Roaring Run
Leonard Creek
South Run
Beaver Run
Hettesheimer Run
York Run
Stone Run
Sorber Run
Baker Run
Windfall Run
Broad Hollow Run
Sugar Run
Cider Run
Butternut Run
Beth Run
Wolf Run
Bean Run
North Branch Bowman Creek
South Branch Bowman Creek
Cherry Run
Tunkhannock Creek
Swale Brook
Billings Mill Brook
Kern Glen Creek
South Branch Tunkhannock Creek
Trout Brook
Ackerly Creek
Kennedy Creek (Pennsylvania)Kennedy Creek
Oxbow Creek
Horton Creek
Oxbow Inlet
Monroe Creek
Field Brook
East Branch Field Brook
Horton Creek
Martins Creek
Hop Bottom Creek
Dry Creek
East Branch Martins Creek
Utley Brook
Willow Brook
East Branch Tunkhannock Creek
Idlewild Creek
Dundaff Creek
Tinker Creek
Little Creek
Tinker Hollow
Millard Creek
Tower Branch
Partners Creek
Nine Partners Creek
Butler Creek
Little Butler Creek
Leslie Creek
Bell Creek
Bear Swamp Creek
Rock Creek
Taques Creek
Mehoopany Creek
Fox Hollow
Rogers Hollow
North Branch Mehoopany Creek
Farr Hollow
Douglas Hollow
Burgess Brook
Miller Brook
Catlin Brook
Sciota Brook
Barnes Brook
Coffee Brook
Smith Cabin Run
Wolf Run
Bowman Hollow
White Brook
Scouten Brook
Kasson Brook
Henry Lott Brook
Stony Brook
Red Brook
Somer Brook
Becker Brook
South Brook
Opossum Brook
Bellas Brook
Cherry Ridge Run
Little Mehoopany Creek
Meshoppen Creek
Little Meshoppen Creek
West Branch Meshoppen Creek
Riley Creek
Baker Creek
Dority Creek
Nick Creek
White Creek
West Creek
North Branch Meshoppen Creek
Thomas Creek
Negro Hollow
Pond Brook
Stevens Creek
Burdick Creek
Tuscarora Creek
Sugar Run Creek
Sugar Run
Wyalusing Creek
East Branch Wyalusing Creek
Wysox Creek
Towanda Creek
South Branch Towanda Creek
Schrader Creek
Sugar Creek
Chemung River
Bentley Creek
Seeley Creek
South Creek
Hammond Creek
Tioga River
Cowanesque River
Troups Creek
North Fork Cowanesque River
Crooked Creek
Mill Creek
Corey Creek
Elk Run
Cayuta Creek
Wappasening Creek
Apalachin Creek
Choconut Creek
Little Snake Creek
Snake Creek
Salt Lick Creek
Canawacta Creek
Starrucca Creek
Shadigee Creek

Potomac RiverPotomac River (MD)Monocacy River (MD)Toms Creek
Middle Creek
Flat Run
Friends Creek
Miney Branch
Piney Creek
Alloway Creek
Marsh Creek
Willoughby Run
Pitzer Run
Rock Creek
White Run
Plum Run
Plum Run
Guinn Run
Winebrenner Run
Stevens Run
Blocher's Run
Antietam Creek
Marsh Run
East Branch Antietam Creek
Red Run
West Branch Antietam Creek
Conococheague Creek
West Branch Conococheague Creek
Buck Run
Licking Creek
Back Creek
Dennis Creek
Falling Spring Branch
Little Conococheague Creek
Licking Creek
Little Cove Creek
Big Cove Creek
Patterson Run
Tonoloway Creek
Little Tonoloway Creek
Sideling Hill Creek
Town Creek
Flintstone Creek
Sweet Root Creek
Elk Lick CreekNorth Branch Potomac River (MD)Evitts Creek
Wills Creek
Gladdens Run
Little Wills Creek
Brush Creek

Gulf of Mexico
(via the Mississippi River)

Ohio River

Ohio RiverFish CreekPennsylvania Fork Fish CreekFlaugherty RunSpring RunWheeling Creek''
Enlow Fork
Robinson Fork
Templeton Fork
Dunkard Fork
North Fork Dunkard Fork
South Fork Dunkard Fork
Buffalo Creek
Castleman Run
Welch Run
Dog Run
Dutch Fork
Ralston Run
Bonar Creek
Narigan Run
Brush Run
Dunkle Run
Hanen Run
Buck Run
Wolf Run
Sawhill Run
Cross Creek (Ohio River tributary)
Scott Run
Parmar Run
North Fork Cross Creek
Middle Fork Cross Creek
Haynan Creek
South Fork Cross Creek
Harmon Creek
Paris Run
Ward Run
Kings Creek
North Fork Kings Creek
Aunt Clara Fork
Lawrence Run
Little Beaver Creek
North Fork Little Beaver Creek
Raccoon Creek
Beaver River
McKinley Run
Hamilton Run
Brady Run
Walnut Bottom Run
Bennett Run
Wallace Run
Thompson Run
Clarks Run
Stockman Run
Connoquenessing Creek
Slippery Rock Creek
Skunk Run
Hell Run
Grindstone Run
Cheeseman Run
Muddy Creek
Taylor Run
Jamison Run
Black Run
Wolf Creek
Hogue Run
Big Run
Glade Run
Long Run
McDonald Run
South Branch Slippery Rock Creek
McMurray Run
North Branch of Slippery Rock Creek
Blacks Creek
Seaton Creek
Brush Creek
Camp Run
Scholars Run
Little Connoquenessing Creek
Breakneck Creek
Likens Run
Wolfe Run
Kaufman Run
Glade Run
South Branch Glade Run
Thorn Creek
Sullivan Run
Bonnie Brook
Wampum Run
Snake Run
Eckles Run
Jenkins Run
Edwards Run
McKee Run
Mahoning River
Hickory Run
Shenango River
Neshannock Creek
Hottenbaugh Run
Little Neshannock Creek
West Branch Little Neshannock Creek
Potter Run
Indian Run
Hunters Run
Mill Run
Pine Run
Beaver Run
Otter Creek
Cool Spring Creek
Yellow Creek
Pymatuning Creek
Little Shenango River
Crooked Creek
Linesville Creek
Chartiers Creek
Whiskey Run
Campbells Run
Robinson Run
Scrubgrass Run
Painters Run
McLaughlin Run
Thoms Run
Millers Run
Coal Run
Brush Run
McPherson Creek
Little Chartiers Creek
Brush Run
Chartiers Run
Plum Run
Westland Run
Georges Run
Catfish Creek

Allegheny River

Allegheny River
Girtys Run
Pine Creek
Squaw Run
Plum Creek
Deer Creek
Riddle Run
Pucketa Creek
Little Pucketa Creek
Bull Creek
Little Bull Creek
McDowell Run
Lardintown Run
Rocky Run
Chartiers Run
Rachel Carson Run
Buffalo Creek
Little Buffalo Creek
Cornplanter Run
Patterson Creek
Kiskiminetas River
Carnahan Run
Beaver Run
Blacklegs Creek
Loyalhanna Creek
Four Mile Run
Mill Creek
Conemaugh River
Blacklick Creek
Two Lick Creek
Yellow Creek
Little Yellow Creek
North Branch Blacklick Creek
South Branch Blacklick Creek
Little Conemaugh River
South Fork Little Conemaugh River
Stonycreek River
Bens Creek
Paint Creek
Shade Creek
Clear Shade Creek
Dark Shade Creek
Quemahoning Creek
Glade Run
Crooked Creek
Plum Creek
North Branch Plum Creek
South Branch Plum Creek
McKee Run
Cowanshannock Creek
Pine Creek
Mahoning Creek
Canoe Creek
Pine Run
Little Mahoning Creek
Redbank Creek
Little Sandy Creek
North Fork Creek
Sandy Lick Creek
Mill Creek
Bear Creek
Silver Creek
South Branch Bear Creek
North Branch Bear Creek
Clarion River
Turkey Run
Licking Creek
Deer Creek
Piney Creek
Toby Creek
Mill Creek
Millstone Creek
Spring Creek
Little Toby Creek
"Bear Creek
Big Mill Creek
Elk Creek
East Branch Clarion River
West Branch Clarion River
Scrubgrass Creek
Sandy Creek
South Sandy Creek
Little Sandy Creek
East Sandy Creek
French Creek
Sugar Creek
Lake Creek
East Branch Sugar Creek
North Deer Creek
Little Creek
Conneaut Outlet
Rock Creek
Williams Run
Watson Run
McMichael Run
Mud Run
Adsit Run
Barber Run
Van Horne Creek
Cussewago Creek
Spring Run
Carr Run
Rundelltown Creek
West Branch Cussewago Creek
Gravel Run
Woodcock Creek
Conneauttee Creek
Little Conneauttee Creek
Torry Run
Darrows Creek
Shenango Creek
Mohawk Run
Muddy Creek
Dead Creek
Mackey Run
Federal Run
Navy Run
LeBoeuf Creek
South Branch French Creek
Horton Run
Bentley Run
Pine Run
Hungry Run
Lilley Run
Beaver Run
Slaughter Run
Baskin Run
Spencer Creek
West Branch French Creek
Bailey Brook
Alder Brook
Townley Run
Darrow Brook
Brannon Run
Charley Run
Oil Creek
Cornplanter Run
Cherry Run
Cherrytree Run
Benninghof Run
Pine Creek
Caldwell Creek
Porky Run
Stony Hollow Run
West Branch Caldwell Creek
Dunderdale Creek
Henderson Run
Church Run
Thompson Creek
McLaughlin Creek
Shirley Run
Dolly Run
Hummer Creek
East Branch Oil Creek
Mosey Run
East Shreve Run
West Shreve Run 
Pithole Creek
Hemlock Creek
Tionesta Creek
Coon Creek
Salmon Creek
West Branch Tionesta Creek
South Branch Tionesta Creek
East Hickory Creek
Tidioute Creek
Brokenstraw Creek
Irvine Run
McKinney Run
Indian Camp Run
Matthews Run
Mead Run
Andrews Run
Little Brokenstraw Creek
Blue Eye Run
Gar Run
Spring Creek
Damon Run
Hare Creek
Coffee Creek
Conewango Creek
Stillwater Creek
Chadakoin River
Kinzua Creek
South Branch Kinzua Creek
Sugar Run
Tunungwant Creek
Latchaw Creek
Foster Brook
Harrisburg Run
Pennbrook Run
Bolivar Run
Kendall Creek
Lafferty Run
East Branch Tunungwant Creek
Rutherford Run
Minard Run
Sheppard Run
Watrous Run
Foster Run
West Branch Tunungwant Creek
Bennett Brook
Marilla Brook
Gilbert Run
Langmade Brook
Fuller Brook
South Penn Run
Kissem Run
Two Mile Run
Knapp Creek
Barden Brook
Oswayo Creek
Little Genesee Creek
Potato Creek
Marvin Creek
Allegheny Portage Creek

Monongahela River

Monongahela River
Four Mile Run
Panther Hollow Run
Phipps Run
Becks Run
Streets Run
Glass Run
West Run
Ninemile Run
Turtle Creek
Brush Creek
Bushy Run
Thompson Run
Crooked Run
Youghiogheny River
Long Run
Crawford Run
Rock Run
Gillespie Run
Pollock Run
Sewickley Creek
Little Sewickley Creek
Kelly Run
Hunters Run
Pinkerton Run
Lick Run
Buffalo Run
Belson Run
Wilson Run
Jacks Run
Township Line Run
Boyer Run
Brinker Run
Welty Run
Cedar Creek
Jacobs Creek
Barren Run
Meadow Creek
Stauffer Run
Sherrick Run
Shupe Run
Brush Run
Laurel Run
Browneller Run
Washington Run
Virgin Run
Furnace Run
Smiley Run
Dickerson Run
Hickman Run
Galley Run
Mounts Creek
Connell Run
Dunbar Creek
Laurel Run
Indian Creek
Morgan Run
Workman Run
Johnson Run
Bruner Run
Crooked Run
Sugar Run
Jonathan Run
Bear Run
Stulls Run
Jim Run
Cucumber Run
Meadow Run
Sheepskin Run
Rock Spring Run
Lick Run
Camp Run
Drake Run
Ramcat Run
Casselman River
Laurel Hill Creek
Coxes Creek
Hen Run
Tub Run
Hall Run
Braddocks Run
Reason Run
Lewis Run (Monongahela River tributary)
Peters Creek
Lewis Run (Peters Creek tributary)
Beam Run
Lick Run
Piney Fork
Wylie Run
Fallen Timber Run
Lobbs Run
Kelly Run (Monongahela River tributary)
Bunola Run
Houston Run
Mingo Creek
Dry Run
Pigeon Creek
Beckets Run
Maple Creek
Speers Run
Hooders Run
Little Redstone Creek
Redstone Creek
Dunlap Creek
Tenmile Creek
South Fork Tenmile Creek
Castile Run
Browns Run
Ruff Creek
Coal Lick Run
Grimes Run
Laurel Run
Sugar Run
Jackson Run
Purman Run
Smith Creek
Toll Gate Run
Browns Creek
Throckmorton Run
Clear Run
Pursley Creek
Rush Run
Lightner Run
Hargus Creek
West Run
Scott Run
Morris Run
Plum Run
Barrs Run
Daniels Run
Rush Run
Bates Run
Pumpkin Run
Muddy Creek
Wallace Run
Antram Run
Middle Run
Browns Run
Little Whiteley Creek
Whiteley Creek
Cats Run
Jacobs Creek
Georges Creek
War Branch
York Run
Mountain Creek
Muddy Run
Dunkard Creek
Cheat River
Big Sandy Creek
Tebolt Run
Quebec Run
McIntire Run
Scotts Run
Chaney Run
Braddock Run
Little Sandy Creek
Camp Run

Lake Erie
Twentymile Creek
Sixteenmile Creek
Twelvemile Creek
Eightmile Creek
Scott Run
Sevenmile Creek
Elliotts Run
Sixmile Creek
Fourmile Creek
Mill Creek
Walnut Creek
Bear Run
Trout Run
Elk Creek
Little Elk Creek
Lamson Run
Crooked Creek
Raccoon Creek
Turkey Creek
Conneaut Creek
East Branch Conneaut Creek
Temple Creek
West Branch Conneaut Creek

Lake Ontario
Genesee River
Cryder Creek

See also

List of rivers of the United States
List of canals in the United States
List of lakes in Pennsylvania

References
USGS Geographic Names Information System (GNIS)
USGS Hydrologic Unit Map - State of Pennsylvania (1974)

Pennsylvania
 
Rivers